Jamsil Station is an underground station on Line 2 and Line 8 of the Seoul Metropolitan Subway. Lotte World is continuous with the Line 2 station. The station is also called Songpa-gu Office Station (송파구청역), due to the proximity of the office building (right outside Exit 10 of the Line 8 station).

The Line 2 station is located in Jamsil-dong and the Line 8 station is located in Sincheon-dong. Both neighborhoods are within Songpa-gu, Seoul.

Station layout

Line 2

Line 8

Passenger load
A survey conducted in 2011 by the Ministry of Land, Infrastructure and Transport on 92 Administrative divisions across the country reported that Jamsil Station is the second-busiest public transit stop after Gangnam Station. It is followed by Sadang Station, Seolleung Station and Sillim Station.

In December 2010 the station had the fourth-highest rate of WiFi data consumption of all the Seoul Metropolitan Subway stations, following Express Bus Terminal Station, Sadang Station, Dongdaemun Station and followed by Jongno 3-ga Station.

Entrance
 Exit 1 : Ways to Bangi dong, Songpa district office, Telecom office of Songpa, Olympic Park
 Exit 2 : Songpa highway, Seokchon Lake
 Exit 4 : Lotte World

References

Seoul Metropolitan Subway stations
Metro stations in Songpa District
Railway stations opened in 1980
1980 establishments in South Korea
20th-century architecture in South Korea